Güvendik can refer to:

 Güvendik, Sultanhisar
 Güvendik, Sungurlu
 Güvendik, Taşova
 Güvəndik